Shadab Faridi Nizami is an Indian singer belong to Sikandara Gharana. Shadab is main lead singer in Indian Sufi band Nizami Bandhu along with his uncle Chand Nizami and brother Sohrab Faridi Nizami. Shadab is a qawwal from Sikandrabad Agra Gharana and his family is court singer at Nizamuddin Dargah in delhi from 700 years.

References

Living people
21st-century Indian male singers
21st-century Indian singers
1978 births
Sufis